is a Japanese toy franchise created by Takara Tomy, in association with the Japan Railways Group. It is a spin-off of the long-running Plarail model train franchise, with the toys first launched back at March 16, 2015. An anime adaptation by OLM aired in all JNN stations in Japan from January 2018 to June 2019. A new anime titled Shinkansen Henkei Robo Shinkalion Z aired from April 2021 to March 2022 on TV Tokyo.

Plot

Shinkalion THE ANIMATION
Several incidents of monster attacks from a mysterious group named Kitoralsus appeared suddenly in Japan after the appearance of the mysterious Black Shinkansen. In response, a secret organization called Shinkansen Ultra Evolution Institute was established in order to investigate the Black Shinkansen and its relations to the attacks using Shinkalions, bullet trains that turn into giant robots. However one day, Hayato Hayasugi, a young grade schooler who is a big railfan due to his father being a staff in the Railway Museum, accidentally got involved in the recent attack by the monsters and discovered his father's secret working with the Shinkansen Ultra Evolution Institute. Hayato shows a surprising amount of aptitude as a Shinkalion driver, based on him using a training application on his father's tablet that he mistook for a mobile game. Despite initial concerns from the adult members of the organization about having children as drivers, Hayato joins several other kids in using Shinkalions to willingly fight against the threat of the Kitoralsus.

Anime film
About half a year after the defeat of the Kitoralsus, giant monstrous beings suddenly appear from space lead by both Nahane and Ohanefu, and are planning to take over the Earth. During these attacks, the Shinkansen Ultra Evolution Institute has been busy developing a new prototype unit - the Shinkalion ALFA-X. Suddenly, a 9-year old Hokuto appears from across time and space. Having no choice, the Shinkansen Ultra Evolution Institute appointed the young Hokuto to become the driver of the Shinkalion ALFA-X and bringing in the teams from all the branches across Japan as the last line of defense against the invaders threatening the planet.

Shinkalion Z
In preparation for the attack of new enemies, the Ultra Evolution Institute is developing a new type of robot called "Shinkalion Z" as well as new armed enhancement rolling stocks known as "Zailiners" that transform from conventional trains to power up the "Shinkalion Z". The children who became the drivers of "Shinkalion Z" with a high compatible rate will work together with the institute staff members to confront the giant monstrous beings that reappeared! The emergence of unknown enemies- And the encounter of two boys.

Development
The franchise's roots dates back to 2012, during the time when Takara Tomy revived the Tomica Hyper series. At the time, the Plarail Hyper Series did not do well in sales and was eventually discontinued in 2013. In order to redevelop the Plarail Hyper Series concept into a new series, Takara Tomy hired several experts from the Japan Railways Group for the new designs and concepts. The new concept is a transforming super robot in the vein of the Plarail series, and was inspired directly from several anime, notably Chō Tokkyū Hikarian. JR East Project and JR East Group were already been long time sponsors of Takara Tomy during Plarail's development, and other branches of the Japan Railways group joined in on its development. The new project was announced under the codename "Project E5" during the 2014 Tokyo Toy Show, with special promotional animation created in collaboration with Japan Railways Group and Shogakukan Music & Digital Entertainment Inc. After the presentation, many changes on the concept were done in order for the toy to be finalized for retail sale and to be compatible with any Plarail tracks. After the changes, the first wave of toys were released on March 16, 2015.

Soon after the release of the toys, Takara Tomy announced that an anime of the series is in the works. The anime, aired in TBS, was released on January 6, 2018. The anime has notable crossovers from both the Vocaloid franchise and the Evangelion franchise in some of its episodes. Hayato and the E5 also cross over in the feature-length film for Tomica Hyper Rescue Drive Head Kidō Kyūkyū Keisatsu. In May 2019, Takara Tomy announced that the anime would end in Summer 2019. A sequel film is also announced to premiere in Winter 2019. In January 2021, a new anime series was announced for spring of that year.

Media

Merchandise
The original Shinkalion toy franchise was released as a spin-off of the Plarail franchise on March 16, 2015. The original toys released, resembles regular Shinkansen trains complete with a front train, middle carriage and back train and that are compatible with any Plarail track. But the three components can transform and combine into a robot that is 18 inches in height and each figure comes with its own weapon and accessories. Also, each figure can also swap parts for added playability.

Within each year, new figures were officially released, especially during the Anime's run. The 2018 line also redesigned many existing models to look more like the animated designs and the real world shinkansen type, though the primary exceptions were the Black Shinkalion models, which were created from scratch-made designs drawn up specifically for the anime. Many of the models are the front and rear trains combined as the upper and lower robot half, with the middle carriage storing the weapons for the resulting robot. The toyline for the Z anime features additional train models that form enhanced replacement limbs and weapons. Unlike the Shinkalions, these models were based on conventional trains.

Other merchandise of the series were also released in the form of keychains and novelties. Good Smile Company also released model kits of the mechas of the series under the Moderoid line of scale models, starting with the Shinkalion E5 Hayabusa in February 2019. A Nendoroid figure of Hatsune Miku, done in the style depicted in the anime series, was released in August 2019.

Anime
An anime television series adaptation of the toyline, titled  was animated by OLM, an anime studio behind Pokémon, airing on all JNN stations in Japan from January 6, 2018, to June 29, 2019. It was directed by Takahiro Ikezoe (Show By Rock!!) and written by Kento Shimoyama (Servant × Service, Kamen Rider Zi-O). The opening song is titled  by Boys and Men. The first ending song is titled "Go One Step Ahead" by Keisuke Murakami, the second ending is titled "I WANNA BE WITH YOU" by TETSUYA, the third ending is titled "Go Way!" by Silent Siren, the fourth ending is titled "STARTRAiN" by Amatsuki and the fifth ending is titled  by BERRY GOODMAN. The series' music is composed by Toshiyuki Watanabe (Galactic Armored Fleet Majestic Prince, Space Brothers).

A new anime television series titled Shinkansen Henkei Robo Shinkalion Z aired from April 9, 2021 to March 18, 2022 on TV Tokyo. Kentaro Yamaguchi is directing the series at OLM, with Takahiro Ikezoe serving as chief director. Ikezoe and Masanao Akahoshi are penning the series' scripts and Norihito Sumitomo is composing the series' music. The opening song is titled  by Boys and Men. The first ending song is titled  by Morinaka Kazaki meets ▽▲TRiNITY▲▽, the second ending song is titled  by Urashimasakatasen, the third ending song is titled  by Luce Twinkle Wink☆ and the fourth ending song is titled "Fastest!" by KOTOKO.

Episode list

Shinkansen Henkei Robo Shinkalion

Shinkansen Henkei Robo Shinkalion Z

Theatrical film
A film sequel to the anime, titled  premiered in cinemas in Japan on December 27, 2019.

Video game
An arcade game based on the franchise,  was developed and published by Takara-Tomy A.R.T.S and was released in March 2018 in Japan. Characters from the series also appeared in various mobile game crossovers, including Alien no Tamago by Paon DP and Sega's mobile RPG game Kotodaman. The series also debuted in Bandai Namco Entertainment's long running Super Robot Wars franchise, starting with Super Robot Wars X-Ω.

Reception
The anime won the Best Award on Television Anime CG Category at the VFX-Japan Awards.

Notes

References

External links
 Official anime website 
 Official film website 
 

2018 anime television series debuts
Japanese children's animated science fiction television series
Mecha anime and manga
OLM, Inc.
Takara Tomy franchises
Takara Tomy
Transforming toy robots
TBS Television (Japan) original programming